Grammonota maculata is a species of dwarf spider in the family Linyphiidae. It is found in the United States and Costa Rica.

References

Linyphiidae
Articles created by Qbugbot
Spiders described in 1896